White oil is an insecticide spray used for controlling a wide range of insect pests in the garden.  The spray works by blocking the breathing pores of insects, causing suffocation and death. It is effective in the control of aphids, scale, mealybug, mites, citrus leaf miner, and smooth skinned caterpillars.
"White oil" is also an alternative name for mineral oil.

Commercial organic pesticide
White oil is sold commercially as a petroleum oil-based organic pesticide, in both a concentrate, and ready-to-use spray bottle or can.

The term "horticultural oil" may be used to differentiate this petroleum oil-based product from home made products using vegetable oil.

DIY recipe
The quantities vary depending on the source, but a common concentrate typical mixture is 4 parts of vegetable oil (a non-mineral oil) to one part of liquid dish-washing soap/detergent (for washing by hand). It may be blended in a mixer or shaken by hand in a jar or bottle until homogeneous to be stored.

Use

Concentrates must be diluted before use at a ratio of 10–20 ml concentrate per litre of water and placed in a spray bottle or sprayer. As with ready-to-use spray bottles or cans, the mixture is applied to all surfaces of a plant's leaves and stems.

All sources note that white oil should not be applied when temperatures above 25–30°C are expected, as this may cause the plant to "burn".

References 

Smythe, Rob. "Canola White Oil - 'Oils ain't Oils Soll!'" Bromeliad Encyclopedia, Florida Council of Bromeliad Societies. Retrieved April 28, 2017.
Coleby-Williams, Jerry (June 21, 2008). "Fact Sheet: Horticultural Oils". Gardening Australia. Australian Broadcasting Corporation. Retrieved January 28, 2013.
Thomson, Sophie (2014). "Fact Sheet: How To Manage Citrus Trees". Gardening Australia. Australian Broadcasting Corporation.
"Natural Garden Pest Control: White oil For Pest Control". Private Exterminator. November 8, 2015.

Insecticides
Organic gardening